Geographical Indications in Singapore are a form of intellectual property consisting of an "indication used in trade to identify goods as originating from a place", provided that "a given quality, reputation or other characteristic of the goods is essentially attributable to that place". Geographical indications originating from any member of the Paris Convention or the WTO can be registered. As of August 2021, 142 Indications have been registered. Geographical indications are registered for a renewable term of 10 years.

Legal basis
Geographical indications can be registered based on the Geographical Indications Act 2014 and the Geographical Indications Rules 2019. The Act replaced the Geographical Indications Act and introduced the registration system. The legislation was aimed at providing protection according to the minimum standards in the TRIPS agreement and to implement a registration system according to the requirements set in the European Union–Singapore Free Trade Agreement. The act entered into force on 1st April 2019.

Registered Geographical Indications
As of August 2021, 142 Geographical Indications had been registered, none of which originating from Singapore. As Singapore had committed to protection of 100 EU Geographical Indications, the majority stems from EU countries. The breakdown by country of origin is shown below:

As of August 2021, two Geographical Indications are still pending, as a result of opposition proceedings: Prosecco (initiated by Australian Grape and Wine Incorporated) and Beierisches Bier (following opposition of the Dutch brewer Bavaria NV).

Types
According to the Schedule to the act, 14 food categories are distinguished:
	Wines
	Spirits
	Beers
	Cheese
	Meat and meat products
	Seafood
	Edible oils
	Non-edible oils
	Fruits
	Vegetables
	Spices and condiments
	Confectionery and baked goods
	Flowers and parts of flowers
	Natural gum

References

Geographical indications